Edsby Castle is a manor house located in Stockholm, Sweden. It was completed in 1872.

Since 1968, the manor has served as a retirement home, but before then, it was the Teleborg girls school.

 acquired the building in 2015.

The manor was built for chief executive of Skandia Elis Fischer who was accused of fraud.

References

External links
 
 Ambea

Houses completed in 1872
History of Stockholm
Historic buildings and structures
Buildings and structures in Stockholm